Pope Peter I may refer to:

 Pope Peter, papal name sometimes referring to the Apostle Peter (c. 1 BC–AD 67)
 Pope Peter I of Alexandria (ruled in 300–311)